The Mississippi State Fair is the state fair of the U.S. state of Mississippi each October.

History 
The fair was founded in 1858. In the 1950s, Medgar Evers led efforts to racially integrate the event.

2020 saw the fair operate under strict measures caused by COVID-19 pandemic; such as wearing masks & social distancing. The fair went on hiatus in 1917–18 & 1942–44.

Fairgrounds 
The fairgrounds cover over a hundred acres in downtown Jackson.  The Mississippi Coliseum is part of the complex. Mississippi's fair grounds is one of the widest.

References

Mississippi culture
State fairs
Festivals in Mississippi
Tourist attractions in Jackson, Mississippi
Buildings and structures in Jackson, Mississippi
1858 establishments in Mississippi
October events